John W. Miller House is a historic home located near Boston, in Rappahannock County, Virginia. It was built in 1842–1843, and is a two-story, I-house, with a central-passage plan and interior end chimneys. It was adorned in 1880–1881, with Italianate features, including an elaborate two-story front porch.  The property also includes the contributing kitchen / quarters, ice house, barn, and Miller family cemetery.

It was added to the National Register of Historic Places in 1991.

References

Houses on the National Register of Historic Places in Virginia
Italianate architecture in Virginia
Houses completed in 1843
Houses in Rappahannock County, Virginia
National Register of Historic Places in Rappahannock County, Virginia
1843 establishments in Virginia